Yunji Town is a town and the seat of Hengnan County in Hunan, China. The town of Yunji has 37 villages and 19 communities under its jurisdiction, its seat is Huangjin Community.

History
The town of Yunji was reformed through the merger of three towns of the former Yunji, Chejiang and Xiangyang on November 18, 2015.

the former Yunji Town
The former Yunji Town was formed on June 9, 1996, it is the central north of the present Yunji Town. The county seat of Hengnan was transferred to the town from Zhongshan North Road in Shigu District on January 19, 2004.

Chejiang Town
Chejiang Town was formed in 1951, it is the western part of the present Yunji Town.

Xiangyang Town
Xiangyang Town was formed from a part of Xiangyang Commune in 1981 and reformed in 1993, it is the southeast of the present Yunji Town.

Subdivisions
The town of Yunji had 75 villages and 17 communities in 2015. Through the merger of village-level divisions in 2016, its divisions was reduced to 56 from 92. The town has 19 communities and 37 villages under its jurisdiction.

37 villages
 Baishui Village
 Baiyang Village
 Changhe Village
 Chaoyang Village
 Dexing Village
 Dukou Village
 Fugao Village
 Fusheng Village
 Gaoxuan Village
 Gutang Village
 Hengxing Village
 Heshi Village
 Huangshi Village
 Huaqiao Village
 Huilong Village
 Jiangxin Village
 Jinpan Village
 Jinsheng Village
 Liang'an Village
 Lingjue Village
 Liping Village
 Longshan Village
 Maotang Village
 Puxian Village
 Qingzhu Village
 Shengli Village
 Shenlong Village
 Shiniufeng Village
 Shitang Village
 Tianzhu Village
 Tieshi Village
 Tugutang Village
 Xiangguling Village
 Xinlian Village
 Yangjiaping Village
 Yangliu Village
 Yuxiang Village

19 communities
 Baohe Community
 Binhe community
 Daqiao Community
 Dongwu Community
 Duiziling Community
 Fuquan Community
 Huangjin Community
 Jiangtang Community
 Jiedao community
 Quanyu Community
 Shanfeng Community
 Shuikou Community
 Tieguanpu Community
 Xiangyang Community
 Xincheng Community
 Xinqiao Community
 Xintang Station Community
 Youyi community
 Yunji Community

External links
 Official Website (中文 / Chinese)

References

Hengnan County
County seats in Hunan